The broad-striped tube-nosed fruit bat (Nyctimene aello), also known as the greater tube-nosed bat is a species of megabat in the genus Nyctimene. It is found in West Papua, Indonesia, Papua New Guinea, and central Philippines.  In 1912, Andersen distinguished it by its very broad dorsal stripe on the center of its back. Although this species is believed to exist at low densities, the IUCN estimates its population to be stable and has no major threats to its continued existence.  The IUCN classifies Nyctimene celaeno Thomas, 1922 as a synonym of this species, however as of 2013 the ITIS lists it as a separate species.

Sources

Nyctimene (genus)
Bats of Oceania
Bats of Southeast Asia
Bats of Indonesia
Mammals of Papua New Guinea
Mammals of Western New Guinea
Least concern biota of Asia
Least concern biota of Oceania
Mammals described in 1900
Taxonomy articles created by Polbot
Taxa named by Oldfield Thomas
Bats of New Guinea